Sargassum is a genus of brown (class Phaeophyceae) macroalgae (seaweed) in the order Fucales. Numerous species are distributed throughout the temperate and tropical oceans of the world, where they generally inhabit shallow water and coral reefs, and the genus is widely known for its planktonic (free-floating) species. Most species within the class Phaeophyceae are predominantly cold-water organisms that benefit from nutrients upwelling, but the genus Sargassum appears to be an exception. Any number of the normally benthic species may take on a planktonic, often pelagic existence after being removed from reefs during rough weather. Two species (S. natans and S. fluitans) have become holopelagic—reproducing vegetatively and never attaching to the seafloor during their lifecycles. The Atlantic Ocean's Sargasso Sea was named after the algae, as it hosts a large amount of Sargassum.

The size of annual blooms in the Atlantic increased by over a hundred-fold, starting in 2011, as a result of factors including increased fertilizer runoff in major rivers such as the Amazon and Congo.

History 
Sargassum was named by the Portuguese sailors who found it in the Sargasso Sea. They called it after the wooly rock rose (Halimium lasianthum) that grew in their water wells at home, and that was called sargaço in Portuguese - from the Latin salicastrum.
	
The Florida Keys and mainland South Florida are well known for the high levels of Sargassum covering their shores. Sargassum or gulfweed was observed by  Columbus. Although the seaweed acquired a legendary reputation for covering the entirety of the Sargasso Sea, making navigation impossible,
it has since been found to occur only in drifts.

Sargassum species are cultivated and cleaned for use as an herbal remedy. Many Chinese herbalists prescribe powdered Sargassum—either the species  S. pallidum, or more rarely, hijiki, S. fusiforme—in doses of 0.5 gram dissolved in warm water and drunk as a tea. It is called  in traditional Chinese medicine, where it is used to resolve "heat phlegm".

Sargassum (F. Sargassaceae) is an important seaweed excessively distributed in tropical and subtropical regions. Different species of Sargassum have folk applications in human nutrition and are considered a rich source of vitamins, carotenoids, proteins, and minerals. Many bioactive chemical compounds that are classified as terpenoids, sterols, sulfated polysaccharides, polyphenols, sargaquinoic acids, sargachromenol, and pheophytin were isolated from different Sargassum species. These isolated compounds and/or extracts exhibit diverse biological activities, including analgesic, anti-inflammatory, antioxidant, neuroprotective, anti-microbial, anti-tumor, fibrinolytic, immune-modulatory, anticoagulant, hepatoprotective, and anti-viral activities.

Description 

Species of this genus of algae may grow to a length of several metres. They are generally brown or dark green in color and consist of a holdfast, a stipe, and a frond. Oogonia and antheridia occur in conceptacles embedded in receptacles on special branches. Some species have berrylike gas-filled bladders that help the fronds float to promote photosynthesis. Many have a rough, sticky texture that, along with a robust but flexible body, help them withstand strong water currents.

Ecology 

Large, pelagic mats of Sargassum in the Sargasso Sea act as one of the only habitats available for ecosystem development; this is because the Sargasso Sea lacks any land boundaries. The Sargassum patches act as a refuge for many species in different parts of their development, but also as a permanent residence for endemic species that can only be found living on and within the Sargassum. These endemic organisms have specialized patterns and colorations that mimic the Sargassum and allow them to be impressively camouflaged in their environment. In total, these Sargassum mats are home to more than 11 phyla and over 100 different species. There is also a total of 81 fish species (36 families represented) that reside in the Sargassum or utilize it for parts of their life cycles.  Other marine organisms, such as young sea turtles, will use the Sargassum as shelter and a resource for food until they reach a size at which they can survive elsewhere. This community is being affected by humans due to overfishing, trash and other types of pollution, and boat traffic, which could eventually lead to the demise of this diverse and unique habitat.  Below is a list of organisms that are associated with the Sargassum in the Sargasso Sea.

The Sargasso Sea plays a major role in the migration of catadromous eel species such as the European eel, the American eel, and the American conger eel. The larvae of these species hatch within the sea and as they grow they travel to Europe or the East Coast of North America. Later in life, the matured eel migrates back to the Sargasso Sea to spawn and lay eggs. It is also believed that after hatching, young loggerhead sea turtles use currents, such as the Gulf Stream, to travel to the Sargasso Sea, where they use the sargassum as cover from predators until they are mature.

Organisms found in the pelagic Sargassum patches,
 Arthropods
 Amphipods
 Skeleton shrimp
 Crabs
 Copepods
 Shrimp
 Sea Spiders
 Worms
 Annelid worms
 Flatworms
 Mollusks
 Nudibranchs
 Snails
 Squid
 Fish
 Sargassum fish
 Porcupinefish
 Triplefin
 Planehead filefish
European eel
American eel
American conger eel
 Others
 Sea turtles

Sargassum is commonly found in the beach drift near Sargassum beds, where they are also known as gulfweed, a term that also can mean all seaweed species washed up on shore.

Sargassum species are found throughout tropical areas of the world and are often the most obvious macrophyte in near-shore areas where Sargassum beds often occur near coral reefs. The plants grow subtidally and attach to coral, rocks, or shells in moderately exposed or sheltered rocky or pebble areas. These tropical populations often undergo seasonal cycles of growth and decay in concert with seasonal changes in sea temperature.
In tropical Sargassum species that are often preferentially consumed by herbivorous fishes and echinoids, a relatively low level of phenolics and tannins occurs.

Inundations 

In limited amounts, washed-ashore Sargassum plays an important role in maintaining Atlantic and Caribbean coastal ecosystems. Once ashore, sargassum provides vital nutrients such as carbon, nitrogen, and phosphorus to coastal ecosystems which border the nutrient-poor waters of the western North Atlantic tropics and subtropics. Additionally, it decreases coastal erosion.

Beginning in 2011, unprecedented quantities of Sargassum began inundating coastal areas in record amounts. Coastlines in Brazil, the Caribbean, Gulf of Mexico, and the east coast of Florida saw quantities of sargassum wash ashore up to three feet deep. The first major Sargassum inundation event occurred in 2011 and had a biomass increase of 200 fold compared to the previous eight years average bloom size. Since 2011 increasingly stronger inundation events have occurred every 2–3 years. During a Sargassum inundation event in 2018, one Sargassum bloom measured over 1600 square kilometers, more than three times the average size. Recent inundation events have caused millions of dollars of lost revenue in the tourism industry, especially hurting small Caribbean countries whose economies are highly dependent on seasonal tourism.

While the Sargasso Sea is a known source of sargassum blooms, variations in the sargassum types composing these inundation events have led researchers to believe that the Sargasso Sea is not the point of origin of inundating Sargassum. Sargassum natans I and Sargassum fluitans III are the dominant sargassum species found in the Sargasso Sea. Recent net sampling studies have found Sargassum natans VIII, a previously rare type, is constituting a dominating percentage of Sargassum biodiversity in the Western Atlantic and Sargasso Sea.

Biological impacts 
Unprecedented Sargassum inundation events cause a range of biological and ecological impacts in affected regions. The decomposition of large quantities of Sargassum along coastlines consumes oxygen, creating large oxygen-depleted zones resulting in fish kills. Decomposing sargassum additionally creates hydrogen sulfide gas, which causes a range of health impacts in humans. During the sargassum inundation event in 2018, 11,000 Acute Sargassum Toxicity cases were reported in an 8-month span on just the Caribbean islands of Guadalupe and Martinique. Massive amounts of floating sargassum present a physical barrier preventing corals and seagrasses from receiving sufficient light, fouling boat propellers, and entangling marine turtles and mammals. With every Sargassum inundation event, large amounts of nutrients are transported from the open ocean to coastal environments. This greatly increases nutrient transport, and its effect on marine and coastal ecosystems are still unknown. Understanding the causes and drivers of Sargassum inundations is critical as they become more commonplace.

Nutrient factors 

The Sargasso Sea, a known source area for Sargassum blooms, is classified as an oligotrophic region. With warm, oxygen-poor waters and low nutrient contents, biomass production is limited by what little nutrients are present. Historically, low nutrient levels in the Sargasso Sea have limited Sargassum production. New influxes of nitrogen and phosphorus are driving factors in increased biomass production.

Recent studies have found three likely drivers of nutrient influx linked to increasing Sargassum biomass: an increase in nutrient output from the Amazon River, increased nutrients in the Gulf of Mexico, and coastal upwelling off the West African Coast which transfers deep nutrient-rich waters to the upper water column where sargassum resides. Nutrient output from the Amazon River has been shown to have a direct delayed effect on large inundation events, which occur one to two years after years of high nutrient output. Phosphates and iron transported via the trade winds from North Africa have been reported to have a fertilizing effect on Sargassum growth; further data is required to understand its role in causing inundating blooms.    
Researchers globally agree that continued research is required to quantify the effect of marine chemical changes and other environmental factors in the recent increase in Sargassum biomass and inundation events.

Currents and winds 
The physical drivers behind Sargassum inundation events are prevailing winds and ocean surface currents. The Caribbean is located in a region heavily affected by trade winds. Trade winds are strong, consistent northeasterlies winds which blow dust-filled dry air from the Sahara across the Atlantic. Trade winds additionally play a critical role in the annual hurricane season in the Western Atlantic. The Caribbean Current and Antilles branch of the Atlantic North Equatorial Current are the major current transporters of Sargassum in the region. 
 
Researchers have recently begun using Moderate Resolution Imaging Spectroradiometer satellite imagery and ocean current data to track and forecast inundation events with a high level of accuracy.

Human effects 
The effects of deforestation, waste-water runoff, and commercial agriculture fertilizer on facilitating the excess accumulation of nutrients in aquatic and marine environments have been well studied and shown to be driving factors in eutrophication. Since detrimental Sargassum inundation events did not begin until 2011, it is likely that an unknown nutrient threshold was reached and surpassed. Given current agricultural policies and practices, it is unlikely these inundation events will disappear on their own without human intervention.

Climate change 
Variations in sea level, salinity, water temperature, chemical composition, rainfall patterns, and water acidity all play roles in regulating algae blooms. As anthropogenic forces increase the variability of these factors, the frequency, duration, severity and geographic range of harmful algae blooms have increased, causing millions of dollars of lost revenue as well as damaging fragile coastal and coral ecosystems.

References

Further reading

External links 

algaebase.org
seaweed.ie
marlin.ac.uk
Sargassum in Northern Ireland.
The SuriaLink Seaplants Handbook – Sargassum
habitas.org.uk
irishseaweed.com
Sargassum reproduction.
Sargassum Early Advisory System Texas
What is the Sargasso Sea? US Department of Commerce, National Oceanic and Atmospheric Administration. (2013, June 1). 

Edible algae
Fucales
Fucales genera
Marine biota of North America